Len Bond (born 2 December 1954) is an English former professional football goalkeeper. He made more than 300 appearances in the Football League, including 168 for Exeter City and 122 for Brentford.

Bond was born in Ilminster, Somerset. He began his career as an apprentice with Bristol City, turning professional in September 1971, although he had made his league debut on the last day of the previous season. He remained at Ashton Gate for a further six years, most of which was spent as deputy to John Shaw or Ray Cashley. In November 1974 he was loaned to Exeter City, playing 30 league games.

The following season, he was loaned three times, to Torquay United in October 1975, to Scunthorpe United in December 1975, and to Colchester United in January 1976, before joining NASL side St. Louis Stars on loan for the 1976 season. Finally, in August 1977, after 30 league games for Bristol City, Bond moved to Brentford, where he was to find regular first-team football, playing 130 games in the next 3 years.

In October 1980 he returned to the south-west, joining Exeter City, playing 138 league games before leaving league football, and joining Yeovil Town. He later joined Weymouth from where he moved to Bath City in October 1987 for a fee of £2,000. He was ever-present for the rest of the season, but chose to return to Yeovil Town after City's relegation from the Conference at the end of the season.

He remained with Yeovil until his retirement, although did have a loan spell with Gloucester City from November 1990 and played three games for them the following season. Soon after his retirement, a chance meeting with Alan Ball led to him becoming goalkeeping coach at Exeter City, while also running a newsagents in Exeter. He subsequently worked as a coach at a number of clubs before coaching in the United States. He returned to the UK and worked with a number of clubs as well as coaching the FA's Youth Academy. He spent three years as goalkeeping coach with Bristol City's Youth Academy before another spell coaching in the United States.

On his return he coached at Exeter City and Torquay United before returning as goalkeeping coach to Yeovil Town. He then joined Bristol Rovers as goalkeeping coach. In 2011 Bond left Yeovil Town to concentrate on his sportswear business.

Honours

As a player 
Brentford
 Football League Fourth Division fourth-place promotion: 1977–78

As an individual 
 Brentford Players' Player of the Year: 1978–79

References

External links
 St. Louis Stars: Len Bond

Living people
1954 births
English Football League players
English footballers
Bristol City F.C. players
Exeter City F.C. players
Torquay United F.C. players
Scunthorpe United F.C. players
Colchester United F.C. players
North American Soccer League (1968–1984) players
St. Louis Stars (soccer) players
Brentford F.C. players
Yeovil Town F.C. players
Weymouth F.C. players
Bath City F.C. players
Gloucester City A.F.C. players
People from Ilminster
Association football goalkeepers
English expatriate sportspeople in the United States
Expatriate soccer players in the United States
English expatriate footballers
Bristol Rovers F.C. non-playing staff